The Hadrosaurus foulkii Leidy Site is a historic archaeological site in Haddonfield, Camden County, New Jersey.  Now set in state-owned parkland, it is where the first relatively complete set of dinosaur bones were discovered in 1838, and then fully excavated by William Parker Foulke in 1858. The dinosaur was later named Hadrosaurus foulkii by Joseph Leidy. The site, designated a National Historic Landmark in 1994, is now a small park known as "Hadrosaurus Park" and is accessed at the eastern end of Maple Avenue in northern Haddonfield.

History
William Parker Foulke, an attorney and amateur paleontologist affiliated with Philadelphia's Academy of Natural Sciences, was vacationing in Haddonfield in 1858, when he was alerted to the discovery in 1838 of large bones on the farm of Joseph Hopkins.  Hopkins and farm workers had been quarrying marl when they uncovered bones resembling vertebrae.  Foulke proceeded to direct a careful excavation in the area surrounding Hopkins' marl pit, turning the finds over to Dr. Joseph Leidy for analysis. Foulke unearthed 35 of an estimated 80 bones from the Hadrosaurus, which is believed to have been herbivorous, 7 meters in length, and weigh 2.5 tons.  It lived during the Cretaceous period, 73 million years ago.  Leidy published an analysis in 1865, and oversaw the creation of a reconstructed skeleton of the creature found in 1868.  This reconstruction, put on public display at the Academy, brought the find a wider public audience.

The site lingered in obscurity until 1984 when a local Boy Scout from Troop 65, Christopher Brees, as part of an Eagle Scout project researched the site and generated publicity, eventually leading to the species being designated the official dinosaur of New Jersey.

See also
List of National Historic Landmarks in New Jersey
National Register of Historic Places listings in Camden County, New Jersey

References

External links
NJ page on discovery
Site Visit plus maps

Haddonfield, New Jersey
National Historic Landmarks in New Jersey
Cretaceous paleontological sites of North America
National Register of Historic Places in Camden County, New Jersey
Paleontology in New Jersey
Natural history of New Jersey
Parks in Camden County, New Jersey
1838 in paleontology
1994 in paleontology
Fossil parks in the United States
Dinosaur fossils